Alvin Morris (December 25, 1913 – July 27, 2012), known professionally as Tony Martin, was an American actor and popular singer.

His career spanned over seven decades, and he scored dozens of hits between the late-1930s and mid-1950s with songs such as "Walk Hand in Hand", "I Love Paris", "Stranger in Paradise" and "I Get Ideas". He was married to actress and dancer Cyd Charisse for 60 years, from 1948 until her death in 2008.

Life and career
Alvin Morris was born on December 25, 1913, in San Francisco, the son of Hattie (née Smith) and Edward Clarence Morris. His family was Jewish, and all of his grandparents had emigrated from Eastern Europe. He was raised in Oakland, California. At the age of ten, he received a saxophone as a gift from his grandmother. He went to Oakland High School and St Mary's College.

In his grammar school glee club, he became an instrumentalist and singer, playing both saxophone and clarinet. He formed his first band, named "The Red Peppers," when he was at Oakland Technical High School, eventually joining the band of a local orchestra leader, Tom Gerun, as a saxophone player sitting alongside the future bandleader Woody Herman. He attended Saint Mary's College of California during the mid-1930s. After college, he left Gerun's band to go to Hollywood to try films. It was at that time that he adopted the stage name of Tony Martin.

On radio, Martin sang and was master of ceremonies on Tune-Up Time, with Andre Kostelanetz, on CBS in the early 1940s. NBC broadcast The Tony Martin Show, a 15-minute variety program, from 1954 to 1956 prior to the evening newscast. One of his guests was Dinah Shore, soon starring in her own hour-long NBC variety program.

He was a featured vocalist on the George Burns and Gracie Allen radio program. On the show Allen playfully flirted with Tony, often threatening to fire him. Allen would say things like, "Oh, Tony, you look so tired, why don't you rest your lips on mine?"

In films, Martin was first cast in a number of bit parts, including a role as a sailor in Follow the Fleet (1936), starring Fred Astaire and Ginger Rogers. He eventually signed with 20th Century-Fox and then Metro-Goldwyn-Mayer in which he starred in a number of musicals. Between 1938 and 1942, he made a number of hit records for Decca. In 1941, Martin received equal billing with the Marx Brothers in their final film for MGM, The Big Store, in an effort to lure pop music fans and as an indication of MGM's lack of interest in the comedy team. In the film he played a rising singer and performed "Tenement Symphony," which was written by Hal Borne, who became his long-time musical director. Martin was the last surviving actor to co-star with the Marx Brothers.

Martin joined the United States Navy in 1942 as a chief specialist, the equivalent of a chief petty officer. He was dismissed from the service that year for "unfitness" after he testified at the court martial of a Naval procurement officer. He enlisted as a specialist after the officer twice failed to obtain a commission for him. Martin said that he had given the officer an auto worth $950 to "facilitate" his enlistment. At the time of his dismissal, the Navy said that removal for unfitness was not equivalent to a dishonorable discharge and "does not carry degradation."

After leaving the Navy, Martin asked his local draft board for immediate induction into the service. He was drafted into the Army and assigned to the United States Army Air Forces. He was assigned to Capt. Glenn Miller's band at the request of Miller, who considered him the best singer in the armed services. Martin later said he felt as though he had "stumbled into heaven through the side door."  Martin was later promoted to technical sergeant in the Air Transport Command and stationed in India, where Brig. Gen. William H. Tunner, commanding the Hump Airlift, put him to work as an entertainer, forming a troupe of amateur talent from the command and taking it around the various bases to perform.

After the war, Martin signed with Mercury Records, then a small independent label run out of Chicago, Illinois. He cut 25 records in 1946 and 1947 for Mercury, including a 1946 recording of "To Each His Own," which became a million-seller. It was awarded a gold disc by the RIAA. This prompted RCA Victor to offer him a record contract, which he signed in 1947 after satisfying his contract obligations to Mercury.

He continued to appear in film musicals during the 1940s and 1950s. His rendition of "Lover Come Back to Me" with Joan Weldon in Deep in My Heart – based on the music of Sigmund Romberg and starring José Ferrer - was one of the highlights of that film. He also starred as Gaylord Ravenal in the Show Boat segment from the 1946 film Till the Clouds Roll By.

In 1958, he became the highest paid performer in Las Vegas, signing a five-year deal at the Desert Inn, earning $25,000 a week.

In an unlikely pairing, Martin recorded for the Motown Records label in the mid-1960s, scoring a minor hit with the record "Talkin' To Your Picture".

In the 1970s, Martin was a television spokesperson for the Lady Brevoni brand of pantyhose sold in supermarkets.

Martin was a stockholder in the Parvin-Dohrmann Corporation, a hotel and casino company that owned the Flamingo Las Vegas.

Martin's professional singing career extended well into his nineties.

Personal life
In 1937, he married actress and singer Alice Faye, with whom he had appeared in several films. They divorced in 1940.

In 1948, Martin married actress and dancer Cyd Charisse. They remained married for 60 years until her death on June 17, 2008. Martin adopted Charisse's son Nicky from her first marriage. They had one son together, Tony Martin, Jr. (August 28, 1950 – April 10, 2011), who predeceased his father.

Martin and Charisse were both Republicans who campaigned for Richard Nixon.

Martin died on the evening of July 27, 2012, of natural causes. He was 98 years old. Martin was buried at the Hillside Memorial Park Cemetery in Culver City, California.

Records

Filmography

 Foolish Hearts (1936)
 Follow the Fleet (1936)
 The Farmer in the Dell (1936)
 Murder on a Bridle Path (1936)
 The Witness Chair (1936) (scenes deleted)
 Poor Little Rich Girl (1936)
 Back to Nature (1936)
 Sing, Baby, Sing (1936)
 Pigskin Parade (1936)
 Banjo on My Knee (1936)
 The Holy Terror (1937)
 Sing and Be Happy (1937)
 You Can't Have Everything (1937)
 Life Begins in College (1937)
 Ali Baba Goes to Town (1937)
 Sally, Irene and Mary (1938)
 Kentucky Moonshine (1938)
 Up the River (1938)
 Thanks for Everything (1938)
 Winner Take All (1939)
 Music in My Heart (1940)
 Ziegfeld Girl (1941)
 The Big Store (1941) as Tommy Rogers
 Till the Clouds Roll By (1946)
 Casbah (1948)
 Hollywood Goes to Bat (1950) (short subject)
 Two Tickets to Broadway (1951)
 Clash by Night (1952) (Cameo)
 Here Come the Girls (1953)
 Easy to Love (1953)
 Deep in My Heart (1954)
 Hit the Deck (1955)
 Meet Me in Las Vegas (1956) (Cameo)
 Quincannon, Frontier Scout (1956)
 Let's Be Happy (1957)
 Dear Mr. Wonderful (1982)

 ''What’s My Line? Tony Martin mystery guest/panelist (Oct 28, 1962) (May 21, 1961)

References

External links

 
 Tony Martin recordings at the Discography of American Historical Recordings.
 Tony Martin bio on the Oldies.com site
 Photographs and literature
 1954 episode of his television series at the Internet Archive

1913 births
2012 deaths
Male actors from California
American entertainers
American male pop singers
Jewish American male actors
Jewish American musicians
Jewish singers
Mercury Records artists
Male actors from San Francisco
RCA Victor artists
Singers from California
American people of Polish-Jewish descent
United States Army Air Forces personnel of World War II
Traditional pop music singers
Metro-Goldwyn-Mayer contract players
Vocalion Records artists
20th-century American male actors
Burials at Hillside Memorial Park Cemetery
California Republicans
American male film actors
United States Army Air Forces soldiers
United States Navy personnel of World War II
United States Navy sailors
21st-century American Jews